Doctor Lawyer is a 2022 South Korean television series starring So Ji-sub, Shin Sung-rok, and Im Soo-hyang. It premiered on MBC TV on June 3, 2022, and aired every Friday and Saturday at 21:50 (KST) for 16 episodes. It is also available for streaming on Disney+ in selected regions.

Synopsis
A genius surgeon who became a lawyer specializing in medical litigation after losing everything through a rigged operation, and a prosecutor in charge of medical crimes who lost her only family (younger brother) and lover due to that operation, work together to punish people who believe that wealth and power can rank above life, and comfort the victims of medical negligence.

Cast

Main
 So Ji-sub as Han Yi-han
Yoo Seon-ho as young Han Yi-han
 Once a genius double-board surgeon specialized in general surgery and cardiothoracic surgery, but now a lawyer specializing in medical litigation.
 Shin Sung-rok as Jayden Lee
 Asian branch manager of Honors Hand, a company that specializes in lobbying and investment.
 Im Soo-hyang as Geum Seok-yeong
Shin Soo-yeon as young Geum Seok-yeong
 A prosecutor in the medical crime division of the Seoul Central District Prosecutors' Office.

Supporting

Banseok Foundation and Hospital
 Lee Geung-young as Gu Jin-gi
 Chairman of Banseok Foundation and Director of Banseok Hospital. He is a candidate for Minister of Health and Welfare.
 Lee Joo-bin as Lim Yu-na
 Director of Banseok R&D Center.
 Lee Dong-ha as Gu Hyun-seong
 Director of Banseok Hospital and Gu Jin-gi's only son.
 Woo Hyun-joo as Pyo Eun-sil
 An ace attorney and the team teader of Banseok Foundation's Legal Team.
 Choi Deok-moon as Lee Do-hyeong
 Former Director of Anesthesia Department at Banseok Hospital, currently serving as Assistant Director of Banseok Hospital.
 Kim Hyung-mook as Park Ki-tae
 A thoracic surgeon at Banseok Hospital.
 Lee Seung-woo as Choi Yo-sub
 A 3rd year fellow at the Thoracic Surgery Department of Banseok Hospital.
 Lee Gyu-bok as Director Cheon
 Gu Jin-gi's bodyguard and assistant.
 Shin Su-jeong as Yoo Ga-yeon
 Head of the management office at Banseok Hospital.
 Kim Ho-jung as Cho Jung-hyun
 Head of Nursing at Banseok Hospital and also served as a Clinical Professor in the Department of Nursing at Banseok University.
 Moon Hee-kyung as Jang Jeong-ok
 Gu Jin-gi's wife.

New Hope Attorney's Office 
 Jung Min-ah as Jo Da-rom
 Special Investigator at New Hope.
 Seo Yoon-ah as Ban Soo-hee
 Jo Da-rom's college senior and ace medical journalist.
 Jo Hyun-sik as Kang Dae-woong
 A nurse from Banseok Hospital who followed Han Yi-han to New Hope.

Medical Crime Division 
 Choi Jae-woong as Baek Kang-ho
 Chief Prosecutor at the Medical Crimes Division at Seoul Central District Prosecutor's Office.
 Noh Young-hak as Jeong Hee-kyung
 A Level 8 investigator in the Medical Crimes Division teaming up with Geum Seok-Young.
 Lee Sang-hoon as Park Gye-jang
 A veteran investigator with 25 years of experience.

Others 
 Nam Myeong-ryeol as Lim Tae-moon
 Former Foreign Minister, Ambassador to the U.S., current Korean Party presidential candidate.
 Kang Kyung-heon as Yoon Mi-sun
 A 4th term member of the National Assembly and the leader of the ruling Daehan Party.
 Kim Tae-gyeom as Michael Young
 Strategy Team Leader of Honors Hand Asia.
 Park Joon-hyuk as Kwon Yun-seok
 Yoon Mi-sun aide and legal assistance.
 Lee Kyung-jin as Jayden's mother	
 She is a kind woman and mother of Jayden.

Extended 
 Han Seung-bin as Geum Seok-ju
 Geum Seok-young's younger brother who suffers from a heart disease.
 Lim Cheol-hyung as Nam Hyuk-cheol
 A death row inmate who was once a reputed medical device businessman, Cho Jung-hyun's ex-husband.
 Kim Yoon-seo as Jung Yun-jeong
 An elite autopsy surgeon from the National Forensic Service.
 Nam Gi-ae as Han Yi-han's mother
 Hwang Hyun-bin as Mongolian housekeeper
 Jang Seo-yeon as Gil Seo-yeon
 An idol who lost her voice due to the side effects of a surgery.
 Park Seon-hye as Gil Seo-yeon's mother
 Park Min-sang as Nam Jun-hwan
 The son of Nam Hyuk-cheol and Jo Jung-hyun. A patient with hypertrophic cardiomyopathy.
 Jung Bo-min as Yang Seon-ae
 Yoon Mi-sun's daughter.
 Kim Dae-geon as Do Jin-woo
 Yang Seon-ae's boyfriend.
 Seo Jin-won as Ho Jun-bu

Production 
On April 27, 2022, photos from the script reading site were released.

Original soundtrack

Part 1

Part 2

Part 3

Part 4

Viewership

Notes

References

External links
  
 Doctor Lawyer at Daum 
 Doctor Lawyer at Naver 
 
 

Korean-language television shows
MBC TV television dramas
2022 South Korean television series debuts
2022 South Korean television series endings
Television series by Celltrion Entertainment
South Korean medical television series
South Korean legal television series
2020s medical television series
2020s legal television series